("Let us raise"), WAB 32, is the first of eight settings of the hymn Tantum ergo composed by Anton Bruckner in 1845.

History 
Bruckner composed the motet in the fall of 1845 at the end of his stay in Kronstorf or at the beginning of his stay in St. Florian Abbey.

The original manuscript, which was dedicated to the St. Florian Abbey, is stored in the archive of the abbey. A copy made by Bruckner's student Oddo Loidol is stored in the archive of the Kremsmünster Monastery.

The motet was first published without the "facultative" bars as Pange lingua by Wöss, Universal Edition, together with the Vexilla regis in 1914 – the reason why Grasberger put is as WAB 32 after the Pange lingua, WAB 31.

Music 

The work of 38 bars (36 bars + a 2-bar Amen) in D major is scored for  choir a cappella. The bars 24 to 34, which Bruckner put as optional, were removed in the first edition.

This early Tantum ergo, which gives a feeling of angelic purity, is in Schubert's style. The fully conventional first part in D major is followed by a second part, which moves on via the mediant key of F-sharp minor and back to the coda in D major.

Selected discography 

The first recording of the Tantum ergo occurred in 1993:
 Joseph Pancik, Prager Kammerchor, Anton Bruckner: Motetten / Choral-Messe – CD: Orfeo C 327 951 A (first strophe of the shortened score)

There are about ten recordings, of which four with the full original setting:
 Jonathan Brown, Ealing Abbey Choir,  Anton Bruckner: Sacred Motets – CD: Herald HAVPCD 213, 1997
 Erwin Ortner, Arnold Schoenberg Chor, Anton Bruckner: Tantum ergo - CD: ASC Edition 3, issue of the choir, 2008
 Sigvards Klava, Latvian Radio Choir, Bruckner: Latin Motets, 2019 – CD Ondine OD 1362
 Tristan Meister, Jugendchor Hochtaunus, Nightfall - Sacred Romantic Part Songs – CD Rondeau ROP6180, 2019

References

Sources 
 Max Auer, Anton Bruckner als Kirchenmusiker, G. Bosse, Regensburg, 1927
 Anton Bruckner – Sämtliche Werke, Band XXI: Kleine Kirchenmusikwerke, Musikwissenschaftlicher Verlag der Internationalen Bruckner-Gesellschaft, Hans Bauernfeind and Leopold Nowak (Editor), Vienna, 1984/2001
 Cornelis van Zwol, Anton Bruckner 1824–1896 – Leven en werken, uitg. Thoth, Bussum, Netherlands, 2012.

External links 
 
  – Wöss edition as Pange lingua
 Pange lingua, recte: Tantum ergo D-Dur, WAB 32 Critical discography by Hans Roelofs 
 A live performance of the Wöss' edition of the motet by the Choir Rondo Histriae (September 2006) can be heard on YouTube: Bruckner's Pange lingua
 A live performance of the original setting of the motet (without the optional bars) by the Vocal ensemble of the University of Cologne (October 2015) can be heard on YouTube: Anton Bruckner: Tantum ergo

Motets by Anton Bruckner
1845 compositions
Compositions in D major